Inquisitor elegans is a species of sea snail, a marine gastropod mollusk in the family Pseudomelatomidae, the turrids and allies.

Description
The length of the shell attains 35 mm.

Distribution
This species occurs in the Indian Ocean off Somalia.

References

 Bozzetti L. (1994). Description of two new species of the genera Xenuroturris Iredale.and Inquisitor from north-western Indian Ocean (Gastropoda Turridae). Bulletin of the Institute of Malacology, Tokyo. 3(2): 24-27.

External links
 
 Gastropods.com: Inquisitor elegans

Endemic fauna of Somalia
elegans
Gastropods described in 1993